The Eagleman Stag is a 9-minute-long stop motion animated film  by Michael Please. It is a darkly comic take on a man's obsession with the quickening perception of time that faces us as we age and his attempts to counter this effect. It won the BAFTA for the Best Short Animation (2011).

The score was composed for a string section by Ben Please and was recorded by Beth Porter, Emma Hooper and Ian Vorley. Ben also played harpsichord on the recordings and produced the sound design for the film. The voice of Peter Eagleman, the main character in the animation, was performed by actor David Cann.

References

External links
 
 

Stop-motion animated short films
2010 animated films
2010 films
British animated short films
2010s animated short films
2010s English-language films
2010s British films